Exiguobacterium chiriqhucha is a bacterium from the genus of Exiguobacterium.

References

Bacillaceae
Bacteria described in 2017